Natalya Borisovna Shipilova (December 31, 1979 in Volgograd) is a Russian team handball player, playing on the Russian women's national handball team. She won gold medal with the Russian winning team in the 2007 World Women's Handball Championship.

She won a silver medal at the 2008 Summer Olympics.

References

Russian female handball players
Handball players at the 2008 Summer Olympics
Handball players at the 2012 Summer Olympics
Olympic handball players of Russia
Olympic silver medalists for Russia
Sportspeople from Volgograd
Living people
Olympic medalists in handball
Medalists at the 2008 Summer Olympics
1979 births